Buffelspruit Nature Reserve is a smallish nature reserve in the far north of the Eastern Cape, South Africa.

It is owned and managed by the Walter Sisulu Local Municipality and is open throughout the year. Mammals frequently spotted are blesbuck, black wildebeest, zebra, gemsbok (Oryx gazella) and springbok, as well as some ostriches. Right next to the reserve's border fence is a target shooting range, mainly used by the South African Police Service for officer training, where they must take care to aim at paper targets and not, of course, at the free-range antelope found nearby.

References

Foot note

Protected areas of the Eastern Cape